Peth Zanigam is a village in Budgam district in Indian Jammu and Kashmir. It is situated at the base of the Pir Panjal Range of the Himalayas, in the Sukhnag Valley. It falls under the administrative division of tehsil Beerwah, which is one of the nine tehsils of district Budgam.

According to Census 2011, Path Zani Gam's population is 975. Out of this, 485 are males while the females count 490 here. This village has 220 kids in the age bracket of 0–6 years. Out of this 102 are boys and 118 are girls.

References

Villages in Budgam district